Riccardo Ladinetti (born 20 December 2000) is an Italian professional footballer who plays as a midfielder for  club Pontedera.

Career
Ladinetti made his Serie A debut for Cagliari on 18 July 2020 in a game against Sassuolo.

On 5 October 2020, he joined Serie C club Olbia on loan.

On 31 January 2022, Ladinetti returned to Olbia on a new loan.

On 6 August 2022, Ladinetti signed with Pontedera.

References

External links
 

2000 births
Living people
Sportspeople from Cagliari
Italian footballers
Association football midfielders
Serie A players
Serie C players
Cagliari Calcio players
Olbia Calcio 1905 players
U.S. Città di Pontedera players